Joshua Andrew Howard (born 30 December 1998) is a professional para athlete from Stockport, England. He competes in the Long Jump in the T38 classification and represented Great Britain at the 2016 Summer IPC European Championships in Grosseto, Italy

Personal history 
Joshua Andrew Howard was born in Stockport in 1998. He was diagnosed with cerebral palsy at birth, due to a lack of oxygen causing brain damage. He attended St. Mary's Primary School in his home town of Reddish. After leaving primary education, Howard went on to study at Reddish Vale High School and then processing on to Loreto College where he studied Media Studies as well as Film Studies.

Athletic career 
Howard first became involved with the sport at a late stage when he was aged 11. His first club was Manchester Harriers, based at Sports City, Manchester. Howard got involved in multiple sports including football and basketball, he trained with Manchester Harriers for four years mainly focusing on the 100m and 200m events. In late 2015, after competing in no competitions, he joined Stockport Harriers where he was introduced to the long jump by Joe Frost. On 5 December, Howard competed in his first long jump competition at Loughborough University, securing a jump of 4.48m, which saw him break the T38 British record.

On 30 January 2016, Howard went back to Loughborough University to compete in the 60m (securing a time of 8.36 seconds) including long jump, where he beat the British Athletics Paralympic Entry Standard with a first round jump of 5.09m. Howard was invited to Grosseto, Italy to be internationally classified as a T38 athlete. He then went on to compete and secured a PB of 5.32m. When he returned he was picked for the IPC European Championships in Grosseto to compete in the T38 long jump with the likes of Richard Whitehead. Howard secured his senior debut, skipping the junior level, and achieving his international vest. Howard competed on 16 June 2016, securing a jump of 5.42, finishing third (no medal).

In September 2016 Josh moved coaches form Joe Frost to Keith Hunter. He was not selected for the London 2017 World Championships.

References 

1995 births
Living people
English long jumpers
Track and field athletes with disabilities
People from Stockport